Rhynchanthus is a genus of plants in the ginger family. It is native to Yunnan, Myanmar, and the Assam region of eastern India.

 Rhynchanthus beesianus W.W.Sm. - Yunnan, Myanmar
 Rhynchanthus bluthianus Wittm. - Myanmar
 Rhynchanthus johnianus Schltr. - Myanmar
 Rhynchanthus longiflorus Hook.f. - Myanmar, Assam

 formerly included

 Rhynchanthus papuanus Gilli = Alpinia acuminata R.M.Sm.
 Rhynchanthus radicalis Valeton = Geocharis radicalis (Valeton) B.L.Burtt & R.M.Sm.
 Rhynchanthus wiesemannianus Loes. & Schlechter - unresolved name

References

Zingiberoideae
Zingiberaceae genera